Monton Green railway station is a closed station in Eccles.

Opened on 1 November 1887, Monton Green was the first station on the London and North Western Railway's Manchester and Wigan Railway, which connected Eccles with Wigan and the Tyldesley Loopline which connected Tyldesley, Leigh and Kenyon Junction. Other stations on the line were located at Worsley and Ellenbrook. The station was built on an embankment at the road junctions of Canal Bank and Parrin Lane in Monton.

The Tyldesley Loopline was earmarked for closure in the Beeching Report, and Monton Green closed on 5 May 1969, along with the rest of the line.

Since closure, the embankment spanning Monton Green has been demolished. However, the embankment running parallel to the Bridgewater Canal has been preserved as part of Salford City Council's Recreation Pathways scheme. The route is popular with walkers & cyclists, as the path gives excellent views over the local area.

References

External links
 http://www.disused-stations.org.uk/m/monton_green/index.shtml

Further reading
 

Disused railway stations in Salford
Former London and North Western Railway stations
Beeching closures in England
Railway stations in Great Britain opened in 1887
Railway stations in Great Britain closed in 1969
Eccles, Greater Manchester